The Pittsburgh Penguin's  Foundation is a non-profit organization located in Pittsburgh, Pennsylvania.
The foundation began on July 20, 2010, with the support of the National Hockey League (NHL)'s, Pittsburgh Penguins ownership group. The foundation offers preventive wellness, developmental programs, charity programs, and promotes activity among youth and families while teaching life skills.

Programs

HEADSUP Pittsburgh
Created in 2011, HEADS UP Pittsburgh is an initiative started by the Pittsburgh Penguins Foundation to provide educational training sessions and events to increase awareness of the severity of concussions. The program educates parents and children about different concussion symptoms and what measures are necessary for an athlete to sustain a possible concussion. HEADSUP Pittsburgh also stresses the importance of taking time to fully recover before returning to sports.

HEADS UP Pittsburgh is funded by the Pittsburgh Penguins Foundation and implemented by UPMC Sports Medicine. The program initially offered free baseline concussion testing for youth hockey players in the Pennsylvania Interscholastic Hockey League (PIHL) and Pittsburgh Amateur Hockey League (PAHL), as well as other youth ice hockey groups registered locally through USA Hockey programs. In 2011, 2,300 youth hockey players were tested. The program expanded its second year to offer free baseline testing for athletes in 12 additional sports.

As of May 2022, more than 26,000 young athletes have received free baseline concussion testing and educational seminars for their parents.

The test, which all NHL players undergo, evaluates the athlete's neurocognitive state which includes brain processing speed, memory, and visual motor skills. If the player suffers a concussion, these test results are then used in order to compare their previous neurocognitive state to that of their possible concussed state. Baseline testing is used because concussions do not show up on CT or MRI scans as they are not structural brain injuries. Testing is necessary because symptoms vary from person to person. These symptoms include nausea, dizziness, concentration problems and/or fuzzy vision. The testing is done by the UPMC Sports Concussion group on the computer program Impact.

The Center for Disease Control and Prevention (CDC) and Community College of Allegheny County (CCAC) also play key roles in this unique program.

Pens FIT 
Implemented at the start of the 2012–13 school year, the Pittsburgh Penguins Foundation developed Pens FIT, a program designed to introduce children to the sport of hockey and facilitate an increase in physical activity. In 2012, the Pittsburgh Penguins Foundation provided 260 elementary schools (public and private) in Allegheny County with free ball hockey equipment and lesson plans as part of their commitment to physical fitness.

In addition to providing the equipment, the Pittsburgh Penguins, Pittsburgh Penguins Foundation, and California University of Pennsylvania devised a street hockey curriculum that is not only suitable for physical education classrooms, but also can be used in community recreation center programs.

The Pens FIT program provides teacher training, instruction and supplemental materials, and the opportunity for continuing education sessions featuring Pittsburgh Penguins coaching staff and alumni.

Pens FIT is funded entirely from proceeds from sales of the 2011 Civic Arena Roof ornament. It is a three-year initiative and within the next two years, the Pens FIT program will move to counties outside Allegheny County.

Project Power Play 
In an effort to combat the sedentary tendencies of America's youth, the Pittsburgh Penguins Foundation created Project Power Play to promote fun, organized physical activity. Project Power Play is designed to take advantage of the growing popularity of hockey in the western Pennsylvania tri-state area by affording young players access to newly constructed, outdoor, multi-use athletic facilities. These structures provide safe areas to play games under the supervision of established organizations.

In partnership with Highmark, the Pittsburgh Penguins Foundation has constructed two new Dek hockey rinks in the City of Pittsburgh; the first at Banks Ville Park and the second at Lewis Park in Hazelwood. The total project is estimated at $2.1 million and involves building 10 additional facilities over the next three years in Allegheny County and the surrounding communities.

The selection of each Dek hockey facility is carefully planned and takes into consideration need, utilization, supervision, and location. The prime consideration for rink placements is whether a potential site is located within local city/county parks or adjacent to managed youth development facilities.

The rink for each of the 12 facilities will feature a steel dasher board system, sports court and is enclosed by a cyclone fence. A Project Power Play start-up kit is provided and includes basic skills and game instructions, along with manuals. Planning and developing skill sessions, instructions and scrimmage games will be coordinated by Pittsburgh Penguins staff. The Penguins organization will also provide ongoing support for the facilities.

Learn To Play 
Through the combined efforts of Sidney Crosby, the Pittsburgh Penguins, Penguins Foundation, Reebok, and Dick's Sporting Goods, Sidney Crosby's Little Penguins Learn to Play Hockey program has introduced more than 4,200 Pittsburgh-area children to the game of hockey.

The Learn to Play program was started in the 2008–09 hockey season with the goal to provide boys and girls, ages 4–8, with hockey equipment and instruction to foster a love of the sport and give children an opportunity to play.

In the 2012–13 season, 1,000 children received free head-to-toe Reebok SC87 equipment, distributed by Dick's Sporting Goods, and the opportunity to learn at one of the 26 participating facilities, including four designed specifically for girls.

Hockey Is For Everyone 
Fundraising efforts in 2011 enabled the Pittsburgh Penguins Foundation to dramatically increase their grant assistance and support for Hockey is for Everyone initiatives. The Mighty Penguins, Steel City Icebergs, and Pittsburgh I.C.E. each received grants through 2011 Civic Arena Roof ornament sales.

Mighty Penguins 
Sled Hockey provides a means for physically challenged individuals to play competitive ice hockey.

Steel City Icebergs 
An adaptive ice hockey program for both children and adults with developmental disabilities such as Autism, Down Syndrome, and traumatic brain injury.

Pittsburgh I.C.E. (Inclusion Creates Equality) 
Pittsburgh I.C.E. provides the opportunity to play ice hockey for children who might never have the opportunity otherwise.

Explorers Series 
In August 2012, the Pittsburgh Penguins Foundation invited children and parents to explore the world through their Explorers Series. The CONSOL Energy Center was transformed into a classroom as 500 families learned through education films, demonstrations and hands-on activities.

Children were encouraged to explore, experience, and learn about Robotics in an exciting venue. Future topics for the Explorers Series topics include Space Exploration, and the Environment.

Signature Events

Skates & Plates Charity Gala presented by Trib Total Media 
Since 1986, the Penguins have hosted an annual charity gala for the benefit of local children's charities that focus on medical research. The events have raised over $5.75 million.

In 2009, the Pittsburgh Penguins re-organized the team's gala and hosted its signature event, the Skates & Plates Charity Gala presented by Trib Total Media, to benefit the Pittsburgh Penguins Foundation, Mario Lemieux Foundation, and Western Pennsylvania Chapter of the Cystic Fibrosis Foundation.

Penguins players don tuxedos and pass plates instead of pucks as they greet guests and serve as waiters for the evening. Top tip honors and bragging rights are captured by a different Penguins' player each season.

Along with dinner, the event features a unique silent auction. Prizes are also awarded to guests for the top tips (guests’ tips are actually a donation to the event's selected charities) collected by the players.

Wine Tasting Gala presented by Highmark 
The Pittsburgh Penguins Foundation annually hosts a Wine Tasting Gala and VIP Dinner at CONSOL Energy Center. The event benefits the Pittsburgh Penguins Foundation and helps the foundation continue its numerous efforts in the western Pennsylvania community.

Charity Auction on AT&T Sports Net 
The Penguins Foundation and Mario Lemieux Foundation teamed up for their second Charity Auction on ROOT Sports in March 2013. Fans attending the team's March 26 home game had an opportunity to purchase mystery bags full of Penguins memorabilia; each bag also included an autographed item from one of the players or Penguins alumni.

For fans not in attendance, ROOT Sports dedicated their broadcast to the auction by promoting the sale of the bags online, along with a variety of exciting auction items that could be bid on through the Pittsburgh Penguins Foundation website. All proceeds benefitted the Mario Lemieux Foundation for cancer research and neonatal research, as well as Pittsburgh Penguins Foundation youth charities.

Hockey Fights Cancer 
Hockey Fights Cancer (HFC) is an initiative founded in December 1998 by the National Hockey League and the National Hockey League Players' Association to raise money and awareness for hockey's most important fight. To date, through the NHL's US and Canadian charitable foundations, more than $12.8 million has been raised under the HFC initiative to support national and local cancer research institutions, children's hospitals, player charities and local cancer organizations. The HFC program is also a component of the NHL's "Biggest Assist Happens Off The Ice" campaign – the League's long-standing tradition of addressing important social issues in North America and around the world.

The Hockey Fights Cancer program is supported by each NHL Member Club, players, NHL Alumni, the NHL Officials' Association, Professional Hockey Trainers and Equipment Managers, corporate marketing partners, broadcast partners, and fans throughout North America.

Open Practice 
Since 2010, the Pittsburgh Penguins and Pittsburgh Penguins Foundation have hosted an Open Hockey Practice for students at CONSOL Energy Center. The event offers a rare opportunity for more than 10,000 children from across Allegheny County and in grades one through eight to see the Penguins at work.

Students are entertained leading up to the start of practice with informational videos about behind-the-scenes aspects of the team and facility. Students are given the opportunity to ask questions of the players and coaches during and after practice. The Open Practice incorporates educational themes (math, geography, etc.) and each student is given an activity book focused on education, health and nutrition to take home.

Summer Sticks presented by UPMC 
Every autumn, the Pittsburgh Penguins host a golf tournament and spend a day on the links for charity. 
The scramble-style tournament features teams of three, each accompanied by a Penguins celebrity captain, competing for tournament prizes. Proceeds from this event benefit the Pittsburgh Penguins Foundation.

Fundraising

Pittsburgh Penguins Foundation 50/50 RAFFLE 
After the Commonwealth of Pennsylvania passed a measure legalizing 50/50 drawings in 2013, the Pittsburgh Penguins Foundation began hosting a 50/50 RAFFLE to help local charities raise funds.

The Pittsburgh Penguins Foundation hosts a 50/50 RAFFLE at all Pittsburgh Penguins home games, and one participating fan wins 50% of the collected amount at each game. For the balance, a majority of the remaining amount is directed to that game's selected charity with the remainder distributed by the Pittsburgh Penguins Foundation to a local 501c3 charity. A different charity is selected to participate in each game.

References

External links
 Pittsburgh Penguins Foundation

Pittsburgh Penguins